Kate Long is an American songwriter and storyteller who writes songs that have been recorded by dozens of artists and won national awards, including the International Bluegrass Music Association Song of the Year.  She is the writing coach for The Charleston Gazette and produces for West Virginia Public Broadcasting.  She hosted and produced the national award-winning In Their Own Country public radio series.  She regularly performs at storytelling festivals around the country.

She is currently co-director and founder of Try This West Virginia.

Awards

 2004 Gerald Loeb Award for Small Newspapers for "Everybody at Risk"

See also
Storytelling
Storytelling festival

External links
Biography at Fiddletunes
Biography at the West Virginia Storytelling Guild

References

Living people
American storytellers
Women storytellers
American women journalists
Gerald Loeb Award winners for Small and Medium Newspapers
Year of birth missing (living people)
21st-century American women